Earl of Aboyne is a title in the Peerage of Scotland, borne in the Gordon family (see the Marquess of Huntly for earlier history of the family).

There is some contemporary evidence that this title was first created for James Gordon, 2nd Viscount Aboyne during the Civil War, but this creation is not recorded in peerage sources.

The title was created (or revived) on 10 September 1660 for Lord Charles Gordon, fourth son of George Gordon, 2nd Marquess of Huntly, and Viscount Aboyne's younger brother. He was made Lord Gordon of Strathaven and Glenlivet at the same time, also in the Peerage of Scotland. His great-great-grandson (the titles having descended from father to son), the fifth Earl, succeeded as Marquess of Huntly in 1836, since when the earldom has been held as a subsidiary title. Earl of Aboyne is now a courtesy title used by the heir apparent to the Marquessate of Huntly.

Earls of Aboyne (1660)
Charles Gordon, 1st Earl of Aboyne (died 1681)
Charles Gordon, 2nd Earl of Aboyne (died 1702)
John Gordon, 3rd Earl of Aboyne (died 1732)
Charles Gordon, 4th Earl of Aboyne (c. 1726–1794)
George Gordon, 5th Earl of Aboyne (1761–1853) (succeeded as 9th Marquess of Huntly in 1836)

see Marquess of Huntly for further succession

Family tree

See also
Viscount Aboyne

Notes

References

Gordon of Gordounston, Robert, A Genealogical History of the Earldom of Sutherland (Edinburgh 1813), p. 528 (the continuation by Gilbert Gordon of Sallagh, concluded in 1651, provides the most explicit evidence that the 2nd Viscount was "created earl by the king's patent" around 1645).

Earldoms in the Peerage of Scotland
House of Gordon
1660 establishments in Scotland
Noble titles created in 1660